The women's 10,000 metres event at the 1998 Commonwealth Games was held on 17 September on National Stadium, Bukit Jalil.

Results

References

10000
1998
1998 in women's athletics